The  is a single-decker minibus produced by Toyota Motor Corporation. It was introduced in 1969, with the second generation introduced in 1982, followed by the third generation in 1992 and the fourth generation in late 2016. In Japan, the Coaster is sold exclusively at Toyota Store dealerships. Since 1996, the Toyota Coaster is also sold under the name Hino Liesse II.

In Japan, the Coaster was formerly produced by Toyota Auto Body at its Yoshiwara plant. In December 2016, after the launching of a revised Coaster, production was transferred to the Honsha plant of a Toyota Auto Body subsidiary, Gifu Auto Body.

A number of unlicensed clones of third generation Coasters have been (and are still) made in China, including Jiangnan Motors' JNQ5041/JNQ6601, Joylong Motors' HKL6700, Golden Dragon's XML6700 and Sunlong Bus' SLK6770.

History

The Toyota Coaster was introduced in 1969 as a 17-passenger minibus using the same running gear as the Toyota Dyna of the time. Early models used the 2.0-litre Toyota R engine with a 4-speed manual transmission. Subsequent models used a variety of four and six-cylinder diesel and petrol engines, and an option of automatic transmission was later introduced. A smaller alternative was later introduced at Toyopet Store locations, based on the Toyota ToyoAce called the Toyota HiAce which had the ability to carry up to 10 passengers but complied with Japanese Government regulations concerning exterior dimensions and engine displacement.

In August 1997, Toyota "Coaster Hybrid EV" minibus was launched, ahead of the Prius. The Coaster Hybrid, according to Toyota, became its first production hybrid vehicle. Production of the Coaster Hybrid continued until 2007.

The LPG Coaster, fueled by liquefied petroleum gas, was developed specifically for the Hong Kong market and its air pollution problems.

The Coaster is widely used in Singapore, Japan, Hong Kong, and Australia, but also in the developing world for minibus operators in Africa, the Middle East, South Asia, the Caribbean, Santa Cruz de la Sierra, Bolivia, Panama, and Peru as public transportation.  These buses are imported mainly from Asia and have the steering wheel moved to the left and the passenger door to the other side.

First generation (U10/B10) 

The Coaster was introduced in February 1969 in 22 and 26-seat models using the Dyna's U platform. It had the  5R petrol engine and the  2J diesel engine and was sold with the model code of RU18 and JU18. All models had a 4-speed manual gearbox with column shift. Air conditioning was available as an option on the deluxe models.

In February 1972, the 2J engine was replaced by the  diesel B engine, which was only available with a 5-speed manual gearbox with column shift. The updated models were sold with the model codes of RU19 and BU19.

In August 1977, the Coaster's model platform code was changed to the B series, although the vehicle itself was mostly unchanged. The RB10 had the same 5R petrol engine as before but RB11 a  20R petrol engine was introduced. The B diesel engine was dropped and the  2B diesel engine was introduced on the B10. 21 and 25-seat models were available in addition to the previous 22 and 26-seat models. A high–roof model was added.

In November 1979, column shift gearbox selection was dropped. All gearboxes were henceforth floor shifted. The 5R petrol engine was also dropped. The front grill received a mild face lift.

In August 1980, the  22R petrol engine was introduced on the RB13 model.

Second generation (B20/B30) 

In May 1982, the Coaster received a major update to its body. It now had a wraparound front windscreen and thicker rear pillars. For the high-roof models, the 2-piece folding passenger door was replaced with a single piece door. The 20R petrol engine was dropped and the 2B diesel engine was replaced with the  3B diesel engine for the BB20. The 22R engine continued on the RB20. It was available in 16, 17, 20, 21, 22 and 26-seat models.

Third generation (B40/B50) 

In December 1992, the body was made more aerodynamic.

Engines were the 4.2-litre 1HD-T turbocharged diesel, the 4.2-litre 1HZ diesel and the 3.4-litre 3B diesel.

In November 1995, the 4WD BB58 was added. The 4.1-litre 15B-F diesel engine was introduced.

In August 1997, a series hybrid EV model was added using a 1.5-litre engine.

The third generation Coaster received a facelift in 2001, and again in 2007.

Fourth generation (B60/B70/B80) 

The fourth generation Toyota Coaster was unveiled on 22 December 2016 and was made available for purchase in Japan on 23 January 2017. It is available with the same engine choices as the outgoing model. The Coaster was the first vehicle to undergo a full redesign under Toyota's newly incorporated Commercial Vehicle (CV) company responsible for the design and development of commercial vehicles. The fourth generation Coaster incorporates many safety features as standard including air-bags for the driver and front passenger, Vehicle Stability Control (VSC), a ringed frame body for increased roll-over protection, pre-tensioners for the seat belts and force limiters which reduce the pressure on the passenger's chest in the event of a collision.

The body was designed in a square shape for a more spacious seating space. The windshield was widened for increased outward visibility. The Coaster is available in three configurations; the standard wheelbase configuration can seat 25 passengers (19 passengers if used in Hong Kong as public light buses), the long wheelbase configuration can either seat 24 or 29 passengers while a school bus configuration can seat 3 adults and 49 children. The school bus configuration does not have a front passenger seat.

For Thailand, the Coaster was unveiled on 5 June 2019 with the Hino 4.0-litre common-rail diesel N04C-VL engine.

Production of models with the N04C diesel engine ended in February 2022.

Variants
 BB10 2B engine First Generation diesel, 22–25 passengers
 RB20 22R 2.4-litre petrol engine, 26 passengers
 BB21/BB22/BB23 3B/13B/14B 4-cyl engine, 26 passengers (1981–1993)
 HB30 2H Engine, 30 passengers
 HB31 12H-T turbo engine for EX models, sliding door (1981–1990)
 HDB30 1HD-T turbo engine for EX models (1989–1993)
 HZB30 1HZ engine, 30 passengers (1990–1993)
 BB40 3B engine, 26 passenger (1993–2003)
 HZB40 1HZ engine, 26 passengers
 HZB50 1HZ engine, 30 passengers (1993–2016)
 HZB51 1HZ turbo engine, Intercooler 30 passengers (1993–2012)
 HDB50 1HD turbo engine, non airbag suspension (1993–2003)
 HDB51 1HD turbo engine, airbag suspension (1993–2003)
 BB50 15B-FTE 4-cyl turbo intercooled engine, 6-speed manual or auto (2003–2006)
 XZB50/XZB51/XZB56 - Hino N04C 4-cyl turbo intercooled engine (2004–2016)
 BB58 15B (1997–1999) / 15B-FT (1999–2004) 4x4 factory built, uses Toyota Mega Cruiser's transmission and front portal axle differentials

Gallery

Conversions
The Toyota Coaster is used for motor home conversions. Retired Coasters are converted for home use by removal of most of the passenger seats, and the addition of beds, kitchens, TV, sink, water tanks, annexes and other fixtures.

The Toyota Coaster has also been used as a road–rail vehicle on the Asato Line with extensive DMV modifications such as an elongated bonnet that houses a mechanism that deploys the front steel wheels and lowers the rear steel wheels which allows the vehicle to run on rails. The original rear axles still move the vehicle in rail mode.

References

External links

 Toyota Coaster website(Japanese)
 Toyota Coaster website(Hong Kong)
 Toyota Coaster website(China)
 75 years of Toyota - Coaster

Coaster
Buses of Japan
Minibuses
Single-deck buses
Cab over vehicles
Vehicles introduced in 1969